Lisa Love (born February 10, 1955 in Cincinnati, Ohio) is the West Coast Director of Vogue and Teen Vogue.

Career
Love spent most of her childhood in Rome, Geneva, and Paris.  She returned to the United States to attend the School of the Museum of Fine Arts, Boston, where she studied painting, and was accepted into the prestigious Skowhegan School of Painting and Sculpture residency. She booked her first modeling job with renowned fashion photographer Arthur Elgort and shortly thereafter returned to Paris to pursue modeling full-time.  In 1985, Love moved to Los Angeles, and in 1987, she took over the West Coast helm of Interview.  Just two years later, she was named West Coast Editor of Vogue.  Currently, as the West Coast Director of Vogue and the West Coast Editor of Teen Vogue, Love heads the Los Angeles offices of both publications, overseeing photoshoots, hosting and producing events, and forging relationships with current noteworthy actors, artists, musicians, and other public figures.

Personal life
She has two children, Nathalie Love and Laura Love.

She was featured on The Hills.

References

External links

1955 births
American fashion journalists
Vogue (magazine) people
Living people
Writers from Cincinnati
American women journalists
Journalists from Ohio
21st-century American women
Skowhegan School of Painting and Sculpture alumni